All is Forgiven is an American sitcom television series created by Howard Gewirtz and Ian Praiser, that aired on NBC from March 20 until June 12, 1986 with the premiere episode being repeated as a "special presentation" on August 23, 1986.  Bess Armstrong starred in the series as Paula Russell.

Premise
Paula Russell is the producer of a soap opera called All is Forgiven who just married a donut executive with a teenage daughter.

Cast
Bess Armstrong as Paula Russell
Terence Knox as Matt Russell
Carol Kane as Nicolette Bingham
Shawnee Smith as Sonia Russell
Valerie Landsburg as Lorraine Elder
Judith-Marie Bergan as Cecile Porter-Lindsey
David Alan Grier as Oliver Royce
Bill Wiley as Wendell Branch
Debi Richter as Sherry Levy

Re-runs
The series was shown in repeats on the A&E cable network through 1988 and HA! TV Comedy Network two years later.

Episodes

References

External links

1986 American television series debuts
1986 American television series endings
1980s American sitcoms
English-language television shows
NBC original programming
Television series by CBS Studios